Ułęż  is a village in Ryki County, Lublin Voivodeship, in eastern Poland. It is the seat of the gmina (administrative district) called Gmina Ułęż.

The village has a population of 677.

References

Villages in Ryki County